The Wrong Girl, is a 1999 television film directed by David Jackson. It stars Barbara Mandrell, Jonathan Scarfe and Zoe McLellan. The film debuted on NBC on January 4, 1999.

Premise
Steve Fisher (Jonathan Scarfe), a 21-year-old man who dropped out of college after making numerous wrong choices due to excessive partying, brings home his new girlfriend, Kelly Garner (Zoe McLellan). However, Steve's overprotective mother, Angela (Barbara Mandrell), is sure that something isn't right about her, which starts a fight with her son. Soon after, everything takes a deadly turn for the worse.

Cast
 Barbara Mandrell as Angela Fisher
 Jonathan Scarfe as Steve Fisher
 Zoe McLellan as Kelly Garner
 Barry Flatman as Jim Fisher
 Joel Keller as Brian Fisher
 Charlotte Sullivan as Bridget Fisher
 Stacie Mistysyn as Missy
 Philip Akin as Police Detective Jacobs

External links

1999 television films
1999 films
NBC network original films
Films directed by David Jackson (director)